Infinite Summer was an online book club–style project started by writer Matthew Baldwin. Sponsored by The Morning News, participants were challenged to read David Foster Wallace's novel Infinite Jest at a rate of about 75 pages a week from June 21 to September 22, 2009.

Baldwin and three other writers acted as "guides", providing commentary on Infinite Summer's website. Participants also contributed commentary over a variety of social networking services, including Facebook, Tumblr, and Twitter, where related posts were marked with the hashtag #infsum. 

Baldwin said in interviews that the project was prompted in part by Wallace's death in September 2008.

Notable participants included Colin Meloy of The Decemberists, Ezra Klein of The Washington Post, and John Krasinski, who was about to release his film adaptation of Wallace's Brief Interviews with Hideous Men. Though he did not participate, John Hodgman called the project "a noble and crazy enterprise".

References

External links
 

American book websites
Book promotion
Internet properties disestablished in 2009